USS Humming Bird (AMc-26) was a unique coastal minesweeper acquired by the U.S. Navy for the dangerous task of removing mines from minefields laid in the water to prevent ships from passing.

The first ship to be named Humming Bird by the Navy was a wooden dragger, built as Whaling City in 1936 by Morse Shipyard, Thomaston, Maine; acquired by purchase 30 October 1940 from her owner, William Hayes of New Bedford, Massachusetts; converted to Navy use at Geo. Lawley & Son, Neponset, Massachusetts, and placed in service 12 June 1941.

Humming Bird operated throughout the war as a minesweeper and minesweeping training vessel, largely in the vicinity of Mine Warfare Training School, Yorktown, Virginia.

She was reclassified Small Boat C-13548, 12 June 1944 and placed out of service at New York 18 February 1945. Delivered to the Maritime Commission, the craft was eventually sold.

References

External links 
 NavSource Online: Mine Warfare Vessel Photo Archive - Humming Bird (AMc 26) - C-13548

Ships built in Thomaston, Maine
1936 ships
Minesweepers of the United States Navy
World War II minesweepers of the United States